The McKinley Climatic Laboratory is both an active laboratory and a historic site located in Building 440 on Eglin Air Force Base, Florida. The laboratory is part of the 96th Test Wing. In addition to Air Force testing, it can be used by other US government agencies and private industry.

On October 6, 1997, it was added to the U.S. National Register of Historic Places. The laboratory was named a National Historic Mechanical Engineering Landmark by the American Society of Mechanical Engineers in 1987.

History
In 1940, the US Army Air Force designated Ladd Field in Fairbanks, Alaska as a cold-weather testing facility. Because sufficiently cold weather was not predictable and often of short duration, Ashley McKinley suggested a refrigerated airplane hangar be built. The facilities were constructed at Eglin Field.

The first tests started in May 1947. Airplanes that were tested included the B-29 Superfortress, C-82 Packet, P-47 Thunderbolt, P-51 Mustang, P-80 Shooting Star, and the Sikorsky H-5D helicopter. More recently, it has tested the C-5 Galaxy, the F-117, the F-22, the Boeing 787, and the Airbus A350 XWB.

On 12 June 1971, the hangar was dedicated as the McKinley Climatic Hangar in honor of Col. Ashley McKinley, who suggested the facility and served at Eglin during its construction.

Buildings

The Building 440 is an insulated, refrigerated hangar. There is an office and instrumentation building, a cold-weather engine test cell, the refrigeration system, mechanical-draft cooling towers, and a steam-heating plant.
 
It was constructed to hold aircraft as large as a B-29, its size also fitting the larger Convair B-36 Peacemaker. It now has  working area. This allows it to test aircraft as large as a C-5A. Under hot conditions, it can achieve .

Snow can be made in the chamber.

Altitudes up to  can be simulated.

The engine test cell was originally used for aircraft engines. It is now called the Equipment Test Chamber and is used mainly for tanks, trucks, and other equipment. The original building had small tests rooms for desert, hot, marine, and jungle conditions. These have been eliminated.

In 1990, much of this floor was replaced with  square slabs. To seal the doors, they are pulled against foam rubber seals. The ceiling insulation is on a corrugated steel deck, which is suspended from the roof trusses by chains.

Refrigeration system

The original coolant was R-12 refrigerant. Liquid refrigerant is held in a low-pressure surge tank. The pressure in this tank is maintained at the saturation pressure for the desired temperature for the cooling coils. The compressed vapor is expanded into an intermediate, desuperheater tank. Liquid condensed in this expansion is drained back to the surge tank. Heat is transferred from the hot vapor to cooling water. Any condensed liquid is returned to the intermediate tank, the surge tank, or the supply tank. Liquid refrigerant from the surge tank is pumped through the cooling coils at sufficient pressure to avoid vaporization. Warmed liquid is returned to the surge tank. As its pressure is reduced, a portion of this liquid will flash into vapor.

There are three such refrigeration systems. Each low-stage compressor is powered by a  motor and each high-stage compressor is powered by a    motor. The system was built by York Corporation. The original motors were Allis-Chalmers induction motors. They have been replaced by variable frequency, synchronous motors manufactured by EMICC that operate between 350 and 1800 rpm. Recent efforts have been made to change from ozone-depleting refrigerants.

For engine tests, there is need for makeup air. Air is also cooled by a two-stage heat exchanger.

References

Government buildings completed in 1944
Buildings and structures in Okaloosa County, Florida
Research installations of the United States Air Force
National Register of Historic Places in Okaloosa County, Florida
Government buildings on the National Register of Historic Places in Florida
Environmental testing
1944 establishments in Florida